"They've Been Working On..." is a science fiction short story by Anton Lee Baker. It was first published in Astounding Science Fiction, in August 1958.

Synopsis
A computer tries to solve problems involving misconfigured railroad cars, but its attempts only make things worse.

Reception
"They've Been Working On..." was a finalist for the 1959 Hugo Award for Best Short Story.

Cat Rambo has cited it as an example of "why titles matter".

References

1958 short stories
Works originally published in Analog Science Fiction and Fact